Firstborn may also refer to:
 Firstborn, eldest child born in a family
 Primogeniture, the firstborn child inherits parents' property
 Firstborn (Judaism), bechor in rabbinical Judaism

Books 
 First Born (comics), a supervillain in DC Comics
 Firstborn (Clarke and Baxter novel), 2007 novel by Arthur C. Clarke and Stephen Baxter
 Firstborn (Thompson and Carter novel), 1991 novel by Paul B. Thompson and Tonya C. Cook

Film and television 
 Firstborn (1984 film), starring Teri Garr and Peter Weller
 First Born (2007 film), starring Elisabeth Shur
 First Born (TV series), British TV show, 1988
 "Firstborn" (Star Trek: The Next Generation), TV episode of Star Trek: The Next Generation
 The First Born (1921 film), starring Sessue Hayakawa
 The First Born (1928 film), starring Miles Mander

Music 
 First Born (Eyedea & Abilities album), 2001
 First Born (The Plot in You album), 2011